Mary Welleck Garretson (December 16, 1896 - May 8, 1971) was a geology teacher and a consultant in the fields of paleontology and stratigraphy. She received a degree in 1919 from Barnard College in New York, studying zoology, stratigraphy and sedimentation.

Personal life 
Mary was born on December 16, 1896 in Cincinnati, Ohio where she spent the majority of her childhood. Her father was Ernest Welleck, a well-known scientific editor and journalist. Her mother was the daughter of Thomas Satterwhite Noble, the noted 19th century American artist.  Mary attended grade school at the Girls Latin School in Boston from 1909 - 1914. After graduating from grade school, she attended Barnard College in New York where she studied a wide diversity of subjects, mostly related to the sciences, and earned an A.B. in 1918. While attending Barnard college, she studied under Professor Amadeus W. Grabau, and later went on to work as his research assistant on multiple research projects  at Columbia University. She received her M.A. degree in Geology from Columbia in 1919, specializing in invertebrate zoology, stratigraphy and sedimentationWhile working and studying at Columbia, Mary met her husband, William Melvin Garretson and was married on September 27, 1922. She had two children, Mary Louise Garretson and William Welleck Garretson. She died in White Plains, New York, on May 8, 1971 after a brief illness.

Work in Geology and Science 
While working on her graduate studies at Columbia University, Mary found a job as a teacher at the Young Men's Christian Association. In her first teaching job, Mary taught her students an Introduction to Geology course from 1921 to 1923. During her teaching job, she also became an assistant at the Brooklyn Children's Museum where her contributions were made throughout 1920. While continuing teaching, Mrs. Garretson began her consulting work in the field of geology during World War Two. She was hired by airline and industrial companies from 1946 to 1951, where she studied and wrote about the geological characteristics of many areas to help these companies thrive. One of these articles was published in the New York Times and was about the geological characteristics of New York City. After finishing her consulting roles, Mary returned to her teaching jobs and eventually become the Vice President of the Haitian- American Resource Company from 1956 to the time of her death. She made tremendous contributions to the Haitian government by consulting and advising on mineral economics, and the development of geological studies and developments in Haiti.

In 1966, Mrs. Garretson's contributions to geology were recognized and she became a member of The Geological Society of America,  American Institute of Mining, Metallurgical and Petroleum Engineers, the International Society of Economic Geologists, the American Geophysical Union, the Geological Society of China, the New York Historical Society, and became a founder of the Westchester County Conservation Association and was on the board of Directors from 1933 to 1950.

Perhaps Mrs. Garretson's greatest achievement was her contribution and aid to the works of Professor Grabau. Mary is referenced in Grabau's A Textbook of Geology and says that she "has been my assistant throughout the arrangement of this text for the press, and has been of the greatest service in securing illustrations. She has a number of block diagrams entirely to her credit as acknowledged in the text, and also a number of other illustrations.”

Contributions to Geological Theory 
Grabau and Garretson believed in and studied the theory of horizontal displacement, and was considered to be a mobilist. The theory of horizontal displacement was first proposed by Alfred Wegner in 1912 and, due to popular belief at that time, was not widely accepted, especially in North America and Europe. The theory starting gaining traction when the model of plate tectonics and continental drift were first introduced. With these models in place, geologists began searching for fossil evidence that could prove that organisms, that can be found all over the globe now, once existed in the same location. Professor Grabau and Mrs. Garretson were among the scientist who took interest to Wegner's claim, and began looking for fossil evidence in North America. During her tenure at Columbia University, Mrs. Garretson assisted Professor Grabau in his book titled "North American Index Fossils." The goal of this paper was to study the various index fossils found in North America and try to compile evidence that supported the theory that a single, great continent was existed on Earth called Pangaea. The book goes into tremendous detail regarding information on each class of fossils found, and each class having its separate structural descriptions and general description of key characteristics tying it to a family, or, genus.

In the early 1930s, Professor Grabau moved to China to study the continental stratigraphy and index fossils the country possessed. During his study in China, Mrs. Garretson was his representative in the United States, and served as his research assistant. Grabau searched for further for evidence of the ancient super continent and informed Mrs. Garrestson of his research, who then  summarized and reported his findings to several Geology groups and faculties in North America. Mrs. Garretson assisted, and was referenced in, all of Professor Grabau's Chinese research papers until his eventual death, including:

 Ordovician Fossils of North China (1921)
  Early Permian Fossils of China (1934)
 Paleozoic Corals of China (1921)
 Stratigraphy of China (1924–25)

References

2.   https://archive.org/details/northamericanind02grab

1896 births
1971 deaths
American paleontologists